The Moselle Viaduct carries the Bundesautobahn 61 over a meander of the river Moselle, connecting the Hunsrück and Eifel mountain ranges.

Moselle Viaduct is also the name of the 1974 bridge where Bundesautobahn 1 between Wittlich and Trier crosses the river Moselle near Schweich.

History and construction 
The Federal Ministry of Transport, Building and Urban Development ordered the construction of the Moselle Viaduct with the state road division of Rhineland-Palatinate and the road department of Andernach. The construction was conducted by Heinz Schnorpfeil Bau GmbH, DSD Dillinger Stahlbau, Ed. Züblin AG, Julius Berger Bauboag AG, and Lenz-Bau AG. The total construction costs were 39 million DM.

Like many bridges in the area, it was built as a steel beam bridge. At the time, it was world's tallest motorway bridge.

Inside the steel deck is a cavity which can be filled with explosives to blow up the entire bridge in case of a war.

The construction works suffered one casualty when on 1 July 1971 an engineer fell off the Blumslay cliff. This later gave rise to the urban legend that he had slipped into one of the hollow piers, and because his body could not be recovered his remains were left at the bottom of the pier.

At the north side of the bridge is a rest area on both sides of the road with an observation site overlooking the Moselle valley and the bridge. One can walk underneath the road deck to the rest area on the opposite side.

See also 
 List of bridges in Germany

Beam bridges
Buildings and structures in Rhineland-Palatinate
Bridges completed in 1972
Road bridges in Germany
Steel bridges
Viaducts in Germany